Andrew Ford (born 21 April 1995) is an Australian water polo player.

Ford was picked in the water polo Sharks squad to compete in the men's water polo tournament at the 2020 Summer Olympics. Coached by  Elvis Fatović, the team finished joint fourth on points in their pool but their inferior goal average meant they finished fifth overall and out of medal contention. They were able to upset Croatia in a group stage match 11–8. Australia at the 2020 Summer Olympics details the results in depth.

References

1995 births
Living people
Water polo players at the 2020 Summer Olympics
Australian male water polo players
Olympic water polo players of Australia
Sportspeople from Perth, Western Australia